The Kalinga State University is a state university in the Philippines.  It is mandated to provide advance institutions in arts, agricultural and natural sciences as well as in technological and professional fields.  Its main campus is located in Tabuk, Kalinga.

It was first established in the 1970s under the name Kalinga Community College.

History
By mandate of DECS Order No. 15, series of 1971, authorizing the operation of government-supported community colleges in the country, the Provincial Board of Kalinga-Apayao, led by Gov. Rolando T. Puzon passed Resolution No. 97, series of 1974, establishing the Kalinga-Apayao State College of Trades and Industries KCCTI which offered purely vocational courses in poultry, piggery, garments, trades and native loom weaving, was then inaugurated with Mr. Augusto Alejandrino as the first Administrator.

Subsequently, the Municipal Council of Tabuk passed Resolution No. 8 authorizing KCCTI to use the Municipal Plaza Reservation, Lot No. 1416 for the putting up of its physical plant with authority to remain in force as long as the college exists.

After securing a government permit, the school opened a two-year Midwifery course. Fortunately, from its first graduates of 45 Midwives, 30 took the Board Examination of which 100% passed. In 1978, the College Administrator successfully worked out the offering of Liberal Arts, Commerce, Education, and Secretarial Courses. Because of this significant development, the Provincial Governor, Hon. Amado B. Almazan, suggested a change of the name of the college from Kalinga Community College of Trades and Industries to Kalinga Community College.

On January 26, 1986, the Kalinga-Apayao State College was created under P.D. 2017 mandating the merging of the Kalinga Community College, the Dona Eufronia Molina Puzon Memorial High School, and the Tabuk National High School. The BIBAK NAS. Nevertheless, due to some technicalities, it was only made operational on October 7, 1992.

That time the Board of Trustees had its first organizational meeting held at the Office of the Undersecretary of the DECS, University of Life Complex. Pasig, Metro Manila.

The meeting was prescribed over by Hon. Luis Baltazar, DECS Undersecretary and was attended by hon. Joseph Albanza, NEDA-CAR Regional Director, Stephen N. Capuyan, DECS-CAR Regional Director, and Mr. Norfredo M. Dulay was designated as the first Board Secretary.

Consequently, the tertiary program of the BIBAK National Agricultural School was integrated with the State College under Memorandum of Agreement entered into and between of the Officer-In-charge of the DECS in January 1993.

On July 7, 1993, the President of the Republic of the Philippines, His Excellency Fidel V. Ramos appointed Dr. Francisco M. Basuel as the first President of the Kalinga-Apayao State College. He assumed office on August 2, 1993.

Within the term of Dr. Basuel from 1993 to 1997, the State College had undertaken certain significant developments. The additional undergraduate programs were B.S. in Agriculture, B.S. in Agricultural Engineering, B.S. in forestry, B.S. in Environmental Studies, B.S. Development Communication, B.S. in Entrepreneurship, and Forest Ranger Certificate. Other short-term vocational courses and training programs were offered aside from the existing academic programs. The graduate school program of KASC was also approved offering graduate degree programs such as Master of Science in Rural Development, Doctor of Philosophy in Development Education, and Doctor of Philosophy in Community Development and Master of Arts in Education.

The needed infrastructure projects were also completed with a budget of P18.9 Million. KASC also acquired for free, 44 hectares of the provincial government reservation where the main campus is now situated.

Other land acquisitions for the educational needs of KASC were the 400 hectares of land located at Rizal, Kalinga from the DENR for purposes of research, extension, and production projects.

Linkages with a good number of regional and national government agencies were established to provide financial assistance and technical support to the State College.

Moreover, KASC as a member-institution of the PASUC-CAR assumed its development role in CAR with watershed Development as its Center of Excellence. In order to enhance its instructional capability, the State College implemented a Faculty and Staff Development Program to upgrade the quality of instruction and the educational qualification of each academic personnel.

A good number of deserving faculty members were sent for study leave and have completed their graduate courses. Dr. Basuel’s term ended in 1997.

On November 2, 1997, Dr. Venus I. Lammawin was elected by the Board of Trustees as the second president of the Kalinga-Apayao State College. Under Dr. Venus I. Lammawin the infrastructure projects, which were started by her predecessor were completed. The Academic Laboratory Buildings, Administrative Building and Library Building, road networks were completed in due time. Personnel and Staff Development became more extensive sending faculty and staff for graduate studies on Saturdays and Sundays aside from those who were given full-time study leave. Enrollment undertook steep increase requiring additional faculty members. There was an increase in library holdings. Under the leadership of Lammawin, the College facilities were upgraded ensuring quality services to its clientele .One frontline service was established which is the computerization of the Registrar’s Office, Cashiering and Payroll sections. Graduating students were also given the chance to avail the CHED-funded Student’s Loan Program.

Some of the outstanding achievements of the State College during the term of Dr. Lammawin include the following: titling of the KASC Bulanao Campus; raising of the status from SUC Level 1 to Level 11 of the State College; outstanding performance on Physical and Financial aspects as evaluated by DBM-CAR: achievement of a good rating by the Graduate School and the BSAEng course as evaluated by the CHED-CAR Regional Quality Assessment team.

On research KASC was able to garner national awards from DOST and Civil Service. The Farmer’s Information Technology Services was also rated outstanding by the evaluators of PCARRD and HARRDEC. The CHED granted P700, 000.00 to establish the Geophysical Information Service Center and JICA also funded the community-based reforestation programs pursued by the school.

Dr. Lammawin ended her term as President of Kalinga-Apayao State College when she was appointed as President of Camuigin Polytechnic State College on October 22, 2006.

The KASC Board of Trustees through its Chairman, Commissioner Saturnino M. Ocampo Jr. appointed Dr. Serafin L. Ngohayon, ISCAF President as, Officer- in-charge of the Office of the President of KASC commencing November 7, 2006; this designation lasted until March 9, 2006.

There are several milestones that Dr. Ngohayon’s leadership attained during his term, such as; he facilitated the Preliminary Survey of AACCUP on the Teacher Education Programs of KASC in February, 2006; the result of which was the candidate status of the BSED and BEED programs; initiated and worked out the textbook grant from CHED from the Knowledge –based Textbook Development project in the amount of P500,000.00; acquisition of encyclopedia and dictionaries from the International Science Foundation; recommended to the Center for Governance of Development to serve as their facilitators and documenters for a research study on education that DAP will conduct in the Cordillera Administrative Region.

Dr. Eduardo T. Bagtang assumed the reins of the presidency on March 10, 2006 just after his appointment as the third President of the Kalinga-Apayao State College on March 9, 2006. As KASC President he was able to institutionalize reforms along instruction, research, extension and production.

As a new president he pursued plans for the improvement of KASC with the prime goal of providing relevant and quality education, harnessing faculty development programs and improvement of facilities

At present, the new administration pursued human resource development by sending faculty and staff to appropriate trainings, more programs are submitted for accreditation and linkages were forged to help KASC achieve its goals and objectives.

From 2006 to date, there are already 3 graduate programs accredited level I and 8 undergraduate programs accredited Level I. He was also instrumental in the achievement of a Level III B Status of KASC in the SUC Leveling.

Research generation and extension projects were intensified with 35 researches and 45 extension programs being pursued at the present.

It was during the present dispensation that linkages in the international and national levels were strengthened. At present the State College has nine international linkages with   the International Center for Agricultural Studies as a prime linkage where agriculture and agro- forestry students were sent to Israel for their on-the-job training.

The State College has also various national and local linkages and is a recipient of the Balik Siyentista Program of DOST and the research grants from Sen. Edgardo J. Angara.

In November 17, 2009, Dr. Eduardo T. Bagtang got a fresh mandate when he was appointed for his 2nd term as President of KASC effective March 9, 2010 until March 8, 2014

Curricular Programmes

Graduate Courses

 Doctor of Philosophy  Major in Developmental Education, and Community Development
 Master of Arts in Education
 Master in Public Administration
 Master of Science in Rural Development
 Master in Business Administration
 Master in Education Major in English, Filipino, Mathematics, and Social Studies

Undergraduate programs
 Bachelor of Agricultural Technology, Major in Food Processing
 Bachelor of Arts in English Language
 Bachelor of Arts in History
 Bachelor of Arts in Political Science
 Bachelor of Elementary Education
 Bachelor of Laws (LLB)
 Bachelor of Science in Accountancy
 Bachelor of Science in Agricultural Engineering
 Bachelor of Science in Agriculture, Major in Food Production Technology, Animal Production Technology, Crop Production Technology
 Bachelor of Science in Business Administration Major in Office Management, and Financial Management
 Bachelor of Science in Civil Engineering
 Bachelor of Science in Computer Engineering
 Bachelor of Science in Criminology
 Bachelor of Science in Entrepreneurship
 Bachelor of Science in Forestry
 Bachelor of Science in Hotel and Restaurant Management
 Bachelor of Science in Information Technology
 Bachelor of Science in Midwifery
 Bachelor of Science in Office Administration
 Bachelor of Science in Public Administration
 Bachelor of Secondary Education Major in Mathematics, Biological Science, Social Studies, Filipino, and English

Short-Term Courses
 Electrical Technology (2 years)
 Automotive Technology (2 years)
 Midwifery Course (2 years)

Laboratory High School
 Secondary Education Development Program Curriculum
 Secondary Math-Science Enhanced Curriculum

References

State universities and colleges in the Philippines
Universities and colleges in Kalinga (province)
Establishments by Philippine presidential decree